Geoffrey Browne may refer to:

 Geoffrey Browne, 3rd Baron Oranmore and Browne (1861–1927), Irish politician
 Geoffrey Browne (MP) (died 1668), Irish lawyer and politician

See also 
 Geoffrey Brown (disambiguation)